Oscar Goulú (born 1913, date of death unknown) was an Argentine equestrian. He competed in two events at the 1948 Summer Olympics.

References

1913 births
Year of death missing
Argentine male equestrians
Argentine dressage riders
Olympic equestrians of Argentina
Equestrians at the 1948 Summer Olympics
Place of birth missing